The Lake Fork of the Gunnison River begins in high mountains in the western region of Colorado, United States, draining the northeastern part of the San Juan Mountains.

Description
After passing through Lake San Cristobal, one of the larger natural lakes of Colorado, it is joined at Lake City by Henson Creek, and from there flows north. For the purposes of this discussion, we will consider the lower Lake Fork Valley to be that part of the river between Lake City and the canyon.

The area is not unlike many other areas in the west. Early on, it was Ute Indian land and when white men began moving into the area, using places and resources of the Utes, there were conflicts. The discovery of gold in Colorado brought numbers of prospectors into the mountains. To deal with these problems, a treaty was signed in 1868, giving much of western Colorado to the Utes. However, gold continued to attract prospectors to the area and troubles continued. To deal with it, a group of Ute leaders were taken to Washington, D.C. in 1873, and under protest, they signed the Brunot treaty which opened a large portion of the San Juan Mountains to prospectors and mining.

Otto Mears, a man responsible for many of the railroads and roads in Colorado, hired Enos Hotchkiss to build a road into the Lake City area, from which it was to continue on to the west. Hotchkiss found gold near present Lake City in 1875, and the town was started. Thus began the era when minerals and mining defined much of the character of the Lake Fork area. Even at these early times, though, there were people who saw the beauty of the mountains and realized that the area had great resources for raising cattle, and so ranches, although secondary to mining, began. With more and more people in the area, there was need for mail and other services and the stagecoach became important. One of these stagecoach routes began at Sapinero, the small town at the intersection of the Lake Fork and the Gunnison Rivers. The route went up over Sapinero Mesa on the east side of the Lake Fork Canyon. A small stream called Johnson Gulch (after an early squatter who built a cabin there) runs from the east to the Lake Fork river, just above the canyon. The stage road dropped into Johnson Gulch and then down into the valley of the Lake Fork. From there it went 2 miles (3 km) to the south where a stage station and large barn were built at what was later called Barnum Station. From there, it continued up the Lake Fork valley to Lake City.

Only small amounts of minerals were able to be taken from the Lake City area in wagons and so pressure for a railroad developed. In 1881, the Denver and Rio Grande (D&RG) built a rail line into Gunnison and then continued to the west to Sapinero. Although a branch had been planned for Lake City, the lack of money delayed it. Finally, in 1879, it was completed. This was the end of the stagecoach in this area. The rail line came up the Lake Fork Canyon and at Johnson Gulch, a water tank was built to provide water for the steam engines. This was called Madera Siding. The rail line continued to the area below Barnum Station where holding corrals were built, and this was an important loading place for cattle which were then shipped to Sapinero and from there on east across Marshall Pass. The major use of the rail line, however, was to carry increasing mineral wealth from the Lake City area. Ranchers along the valley were also dependent on the train to bring mail and needed supplies.

As with so many other mining areas, the mines of Lake City began producing less and less. Finally in 1933, the rail line was making little money and was abandoned by the D&RG. The line was purchased and called the San Cristobal Railroad, and a galloping goose was built to run on the tracks and to take mail and other things to and from Lake City. The galloping goose was a combination between a car and a railway car, built on a Pierce-Arrow body. It used a gasoline engine and could be driven up the railroad tracks and carry mail and limited amounts of freight. This was never very successful, though, and the rail line was completely abandoned in 1939. By this time, there were automobile roads into the area, and mail was brought into the valley from Gunnison in this way.

See also

 List of places in Colorado

References

External links
 Ghostdepot.com: Otto Mears

Valleys of Colorado
Rivers of Gunnison County, Colorado
Gunnison River
Rivers of Colorado
Colorado Western Slope